Gilbert L. Lamb (June 14, 1904 – November 2, 1995) was an American actor. He appeared in more than 60 films and television shows between 1935 and 1980. He was also was a stage actor, who appeared in several musicals on Broadway, including Folies Bergère (1939), Hold on to Your Hats (1940-1941), Sleepy Hollow (1948), and 70, Girls, 70 (1971).

Gil and his wife, Dolores, adopted a child in the 1940s, they named him Dennis.

Selected filmography

 The Fleet's In (1942) - Spike
 Star Spangled Rhythm (1942) - High Pockets
 Riding High (1943) - Bob 'Foggy' Day
 Rainbow Island (1944) - Pete Jenkins
 Practically Yours (1944) - Albert W. Beagell
 Hit Parade of 1947 (1947) - Eddie Page
 Addio Mimí! (1949) - Pierre
 Make Mine Laughs (1949) - Master of Ceremonies
 Joe Palooka in Humphrey Takes a Chance (1950) - Martin
 The Boss (1956) - Henry
 Terror in a Texas Town (1958) - Barnaby (uncredited)
 Bells Are Ringing (1960) - Pratfalling Party Guest (uncredited)
 Breakfast at Tiffany's (1961) - Gil - Party Guest with Harriet (uncredited)
 Bye Bye Birdie (1963) - Lanky Shriner
 Good Neighbor Sam (1964) - Drunk (uncredited)
 The Ugly Dachshund (1966) - Milkman (uncredited)
 The Gnome-Mobile (1967) - Gas Attendant
 Blackbeard's Ghost (1968) - Waiter
 The Shakiest Gun in the West (1968) - Slosh White - Drunk (uncredited)
 The Horse in the Gray Flannel Suit (1968) - Bit Comic (uncredited)
 The Love Bug (1968) - Policeman at Park
 The Boatniks (1970) - Mr. Mitchell
 Norwood (1970) - Mr. Remley
 Nightmare Circus (1974) - Mr. Alvarez
 Day of the Animals (1977) - Old Man in Bar

References

External links

1904 births
1995 deaths
20th-century American male actors
American male film actors
American male television actors
Male actors from Minneapolis